Baseball at the 1991 Pan American Games was contested between teams representing Aruba, Canada, Cuba, Dominican Republic, Mexico, Netherlands Antilles, Nicaragua, Puerto Rico, and the United States. The 1991 edition was the 11th Pan American Games, and was hosted by Havana.

Cuba entered the competition as the five-time defending champions, having won each gold medal dating back to 1971. They successfully defended their title, with Puerto Rico finishing second.

Medal summary

Medal table

Medalists

References

 

1991
Events at the 1991 Pan American Games
Pan American Games
1991 Pan American Games